Taking Chances is a 1922 American silent film. A showing in Cleveland Heights was interrupted by police for violating Blue Laws prohibitting Sunday (Sabbath) entertainment showings and performances. Arrests were made.

Plot 

A book salesman (Talmadge) talks his way into a position as secretary to a millionaire capitalist (Challenger) and eventually wins the hand of the mans daughter (Gray) by foiling a plot against her father's wealth and punishing one of the plotters (Dewey).

Production 
The film was produced by Phil Goldstone Productions, with Grover Jones as the director and Harry Fowler as the cinematographer.

Cast 

 Richard Talmadge as himself
 Zella Gray as Mildred Arlington
 Elmer Dewey as José Borquez
 Percy Challenger as James Arlington

References

External links 
 
 

1922 films
American silent films
American black-and-white films
1920s American films